Muzykivka is a large village located in Kherson Raion north of the city of Kherson, Kherson Oblast. It hosts the administration of Muzykivka rural hromada, one of the hromadas of Ukraine.

Geography 
The village is situated 13 km from the centre of Kherson city. It has an area of 5.6km2 and a population of approximately 2,672 people. The nearest airport to the village is Kherson International Airport, located 8 km south west, in the town of Chornobaivka.

Administrative status 
Until July 2020, Muzykivka was in the Bilozerka Raion of Kherson Oblast. The raion was abolished in July 2020 as a result of the administrative reform of Ukraine's districts, which reduced the number of raions of Kherson Oblast to five, merging Bilozerka Raion into Kherson Raion.

Russian invasion and occupation 
When Russia invaded Ukraine, Kherson city was captured within 2 days and the village was captured by Russian forces on 28 February 2022. It was occupied from this date until 11 November 2022, when Ukraine's armed forces (AFU/ЗСУ) liberated the area.

References 

Villages in Kherson Raion